In model checking, a field of computer science, Timed Propositional Temporal Logic (TPTL) is an extension of Linear Temporal Logic (LTL) in which variables are introduced to measure times between two events. For example, while LTL allows to state that each event p is eventually followed by an event q, TPTL furthermore allows to give a time limit for q to occur.

Syntax 
The future fragment of TPTL is defined similarly to linear temporal logic, in which furthermore, clock variables can be introduced and compared to constants. Formally, given a set  of clocks, MTL is built up from:
 a finite set of propositional variables AP, 
 the logical operators ¬ and ∨, and 
 the temporal modal operator U,
 a freeze quantification operator , for  a TPTL formula with set of clocks .

The logic TPTL+Past is built as the future fragment of TLS and also contains
 the temporal modal operator S.

Note that the next operator N is not considered to be a part of MTL syntax. It will instead be defined from other operators.

A closed formula is a formula over an empty set of clocks.

Model 
Let  it intuitively represents a set of time. Let  a function which associate to each moment  a set of propositions from AP. A model of a TPTL formula is such a function . Usually,  is either a timed word or a signal. In those cases,  is either a discrete subset or an interval containing 0.

Semantic 
Let  a set of clocks.

We are now going to explain what it means that a TPTL formula  holds at time  for a valuation .
We first consider formulas whose main operator also belongs to LTL:
  holds if ,
  holds if either  or 
  holds if either  or 
  holds if  holds,
  holds if .

Metric temporal logic 
Metric temporal logic is another extension of LTL which allow to measure time. The semantic of the formula  at some time  is essentially the same than the semantic of the formula , with the constraints that the time  at which  must hold occurs in the interval .

TPTL is as least as expressive as MTL. Indeed, the MTL formula  is equivalent to the TPTL formula  where  is a new variable.

TPTL is strictly more expressive than MTL both over timed words and over signals.

Comparison with LTL 
We can consider such a word using the set of time , and the function .

References

Temporal logic
Model checking